V-sit is the second album by Masami Okui, released on September 21, 1996.

Track listing
Mask (masamix)
 Anime television series Sorcerer Hunters ending song
 Lyrics, composition: Masami Okui
 Arrangement: Toshiro Yabuki, Tsutomu Ohira

 Radio drama Slayers EX image song
 Lyrics, composition: Masami Okui
 Arrangement: Toshiro Yabuki
Shake it
 OVA Starship Girl Yamamoto Yohko theme song
 Lyrics, composition: Masami Okui
 Arrangement: Toshiro Yabuki, Tsutomu Ohira

 Lyrics, composition: Masami Okui
 Arrangement: Toshiro Yabuki, Tsutomu Ohira
Lonely soul
 OVA Starship Girl Yamamoto Yohko image song
 Lyrics: Masami Okui
 Composition, arrangement: Tsutomu Ohira
Dreaming Heart
 OVA Megami Paradise ending song
 Lyrics: Keiko Kimoto
 Composition: Gota Wakabayashi
 Arrangement: Tsutomu Ohira

 Lyrics, composition: Masami Okui
 Arrangement: Tsutomu Ohira
Love is Fire
 Lyrics: Masami Okui
 Composition: Tsutomu Ohira
 Arrangement: Toshiro Yabuki, Tsutomu Ohira
Get My Way
 OVA Megami Paradise opening song
 Lyrics: Narumi Yamamoto
 Composition, arrangement: Toshiro Yabuki

 Radio drama Slayers EX image song
 Lyrics: Masami Okui
 Composition, arrangement: Tsutomu Ohira
)
 Radio drama Sorcerer Hunters SP image song
 Originally sung by Yuko Mizutani
 Lyrics, composition: Masami Okui
 Arrangement: Toshiro Yabuki
Majime na Kikkake
 Radio drama Slayers EX image song
 Lyrics, composition: Masami Okui
 Arrangement: Toshiro Yabuki
 (live rock on)
 Anime television series Slayers Next ending song
 Lyrics: Masami Okui
 Composition: Masami Okui, Toshiro Yabuki
 Arrangement: Toshiro Yabuki
Friends
 Lyrics: Masami Okui
 Composition, arrangement: Tsutomu Ohira

Sources
Official website: Makusonia

1996 albums
Masami Okui albums